The Mies Building for the Eskenazi School of Art, Architecture + Design is a building under construction on the campus of Indiana University. The building is based upon plans Mies van der Rohe created in 1952.

References

Ludwig Mies van der Rohe buildings